Roy Allison Rickey (November 15, 1893 – September 6, 1959) was a Canadian professional ice hockey player who played in the Pacific Coast Hockey Association and Western Canada Hockey League.  He played for the Seattle Metropolitans and Edmonton Eskimos.  He won a Stanley Cup with the Metropolitans in 1917.

Playing career
Born in Ottawa, Ontario, Rickey began his professional career in the 1911–12 season with the Saskatoon Wholesalers of the Saskatchewan Professional League.

Rickey joined the Seattle Metropolitans in 1915, played eight seasons for the Metropolitans, and was a member of the 1917 Stanley Cup champions. He also played in the 1919 Stanley Cup Finals with the Metropolitans, but the series against the Montreal Canadiens was cancelled at 2-2 because of the Spanish flu. Rickey himself was at the Providence Hospital in Seattle with a high fever.

In 1924, Rickey joined the Edmonton Eskimos. In 1925, his contract was sold by the Eskimos to the New York Americans, but he did not join the team. After the Western Canada Hockey League folded in 1926, Rickey played in the Can-Pro League, playing two further seasons for Hamilton and Niagara Falls before retiring from professional play.

References

External links

1893 births
1959 deaths
Canadian ice hockey defencemen
Edmonton Eskimos (ice hockey) players
Ice hockey people from Ottawa
Seattle Metropolitans players
Stanley Cup champions
Canadian expatriate ice hockey players in the United States